Phaulernis montuosa is a moth in the family Epermeniidae. It was described by Reinhard Gaedike in 2013. It is found in Kenya, Malawi and Tanzania.

References

Moths described in 2013
Epermeniidae
Lepidoptera of Kenya
Lepidoptera of Malawi
Lepidoptera of Tanzania
Moths of Sub-Saharan Africa